Rickey Isom (born November 30, 1963) is a former American football running back. He played for the Miami Dolphins in 1987. He played as a replacement player for the NFL during the 1987 players strike.

References

1963 births
Living people
American football running backs
NC State Wolfpack football players
Miami Dolphins players